Jonathan Solomon (born 14 November 1967) is a former Australian rules footballer who played with the Brisbane Bears in the Australian Football League (AFL).

Solomon came from Seymour in country Victoria and came to Brisbane after being selected with the 44th pick of the 1989 VFL draft.

He played just two AFL games for the Bears, both in the 1990 AFL season. On his debut against Collingwood at Carrara he kicked a goal and had seven disposals. He appeared again the following round, when Brisbane met Carlton at Princes Park.

References

External links 
 
 

1967 births
Australian rules footballers from Victoria (Australia)
Brisbane Bears players
Seymour Football Club players
Living people